HMS Cachalot (S06) was a Porpoise-class submarine. Her keel was laid down on 1 August 1955 by Scotts Shipbuilding and Engineering Company at Greenock. She was launched on 11 December 1957, and commissioned on 1 September 1959.

Design
The Porpoise class was the first class of operational submarines built for the Royal Navy after the end of the Second World War, and were designed to take advantage of experience gained by studying German Type XXI U-boats and British wartime experiments with the submarine , which was modified by streamlining and fitting a bigger battery.

Displacement was  standard and  full load surfaced and  submerged. Eight  torpedo tubes were fitted; six in the bow, and two in the stern. Up to 30 torpedoes could be carried, with the initial outfit consisting of the unguided Mark 8 and the homing Mark 20 torpedoes.

Service
Cachalot attended the 1977 Silver Jubilee Fleet Review off Spithead when she was part of the Submarine Flotilla.

She was sold on 12 November 1979 for breaking up at Blyth.

References

Publications
 
 
 
 
 

 

British Porpoise-class submarines
Ships built on the River Clyde
1957 ships